The 1998 SAGA World World Indoor Bowls Championship  was held at Preston Guild Hall, Preston, England, from 13–23 January 1998.

In the Singles the unseeded Paul Foster, a 100-1 outsider won his first title beating Mervyn King in the final.
In the Pairs Richard Corsie and Graham Robertson won defeating Andy Thomson and Gary Smith in the final.

The Women's World Championship took place at the Selwyn Samuel Centre in Llanelli from April 22–28. The event was won by Caroline McAllister.

Winners

Draw and results

Men's singles

Men's Pairs

Women's singles

Group stages

References

External links 
Official website

World Indoor Bowls Championship
1998 in bowls